is a railway station located in Ichikikushikino, Kagoshima, Japan. The station opened on March 13, 2010.

Lines 
Kyushu Railway Company
Kagoshima Main Line

JR

Adjacent stations

Nearby places
Kamimura Gakuen Elementary & Junior & Senior High School
Japan National Route 3

Railway stations in Kagoshima Prefecture
Railway stations in Japan opened in 2010